The 2004 season was the Hawthorn Football Club's 80th season in the Australian Football League and 103rd overall. Following the season Alastair Clarkson was appointed as coach.

Fixture

Premiership season

Ladder

References

Hawthorn Football Club season, 2004
Hawthorn Football Club seasons